Mihaela Rădulescu (born 3 August 1969) is a Romanian businesswoman, television host and producer, expert in humanitarian campaigns, social activist, bestseller author, and columnist. She is also a goodwill ambassador for United Way Worldwide, Hospice House of Hope, and Save the Children. She created her own foundation, Fundația Ayan, exclusively dedicated to helping children. 
She is well-known for hosting the long-running TV show "Duminica în familie" on Antena 1 for ten years, for her numerous roles as a TV show hostess and producer for programs like Lucky Star, Gala, Punem Pariu că-i vara, Ferma, and Uite cine dansează (Pro TV).

Career 
When she was born, Rădulescu's parents were still students; later they became teachers. She and her brother, Florin, were raised by their grandparents.

Rădulescu attended courses in no less than three faculties, but did not get a bachelor's degree. She was a student at the National Academy of Physical Education and Sports for three years, in philology and foreign languages for two years, and for three years she attended the courses at the Faculty of Psychology.

Rădulescu started her career as soon as she moved to Bucharest. She was an instructor of aerobic and fitness gymnastics, a taxi driver (when she was a student), secretary in the first post-revolution government, referent at the Office of Foreign Relations and Protocol of the Senate, head of the cabinet at the Romanian Senate, director of the International Festival Dakino for three editions, and director and co-organizer of two editions of the elite international model show, "Look of the Year".

Rădulescu began a very successful career as a TV host and TV producer, becoming number 1 in Romania - "Duminica in familie" (Sunday in the family) at Antena 1, "Your Lucky Star" at Pro TV. She was the first female journalist to make war documentaries in Iraq and Afghanistan, in 2005-2006. During her career, Rădulescu has worked for Tele7ABC, Pro TV, Antena 1, and B1 TV. 

Rădulescu served as a jury member on Romania's Got Talent at Pro TV, for six years. She has also been a host for "Dancing with the Stars" on Pro TV. Since 2017, she has been host of The Farm on Pro TV. In 2021 she served as a jury member on The Masked Singer on Pro TV. 

In other entertainment work, Rădulescu has appeared in six Romanian films. She was also chosen to dub the Flame character in Romanian in the animated movie Turbo in 2013. and Mittens in the Disney movie Bolt. 
Rădulescu is the author of five best-selling books, published by Polirom Publishing House. She has been on the cover of many magazines, including Elle, Marie Claire, Unica, Viva, and Cosmopolitan. 

Rădulescu is known as an eco-activist, working with To.org and other companies. She was awarded with the Order of Merit by King Mihai of Romania for her humanitarian campaigns and for improving the quality of the public dialogue. She was also awarded Woman of the Year five times for her outstanding philanthropic work and as a social activist. Rădulescu has also received the Tocqueville Award for her charity donations, mostly for hospitals and children. She is experienced in blitzkrieg humanitarian campaigns to raise money for those in need. Her most known campaign was for flood victims, as well as numerous personal donations for different humanitarian causes, mostly dedicated to helping children. Partners in her social activism include Save the Children, the United Way, the Red Cross, Hospice, Baroness Emma Nicholson, and the International School of Monaco (helping orphans from Petrosani). 

Rădulescu lives in Monaco with her son, continuing her humanitarian actions for Romania (the latest in 2020, putting together the first trial unit at Fundeni Hospital Bucharest), as well as working as a TV host for Pro TV. Her partner is Felix Baumgartner, the Red Bull athlete who broke the speed of sound in freefall from the stratosphere.

Achievements 
 She was the first Romanian journalist to broadcast live from the Oscars and Grammies (Pro TV, 1998).
 She was the first woman to parachute from 3000 metres live on TV.
 Conducted the first underwater interview live in Romania.
 Is the first Romanian star to become a lingerie spokesmodel for I.D. Sarrieri: "Body Up – Mihaela Rădulescu".

References 

Living people
People from Piatra Neamț
Romanian television presenters
Romanian women television presenters
1969 births